Orthochromis malagaraziensis is a species of cichlid native to the Malagarasi River in Tanzania and Burundi.  This species can reach a length of  SL.

References

External links

malagaraziensis
Fish described in 1937
Taxonomy articles created by Polbot